Rock Manager is a business simulation game for Microsoft Windows.

Gameplay
Rock Manager puts the player in control of a rock band with the task of making them into rockstars.

Play starts with putting a band together. The player chooses from a list of musicians with all tastes and styles. Record a demo in a studio, adding effects to the song to make it fit the band's image. With a demo in hand, it's up to the player to bag a record deal, arrange gigs, promote the record and go on the road. But it is important to keep an eye on the musicians and keep them happy or the band might self-destruct.

Options are selected using an icon system, but recording and practicing takes place in real time.

There are five styles of music you can use: Rock, Pop, Dance, Punk and Heavy metal.

External links

Rock Manager at GameFAQs

Business simulation games
Windows games
Windows-only games
2002 video games
DreamCatcher Interactive games
Video games developed in Sweden